Juan Onofre Vélez Ríos (June 14, 1942 – August 28, 1995) was a Major League Baseball shortstop/second baseman who played for one season. Originally signed by the New York Mets, Rios played for the Kansas City Royals for 87 games during the inaugural 1969 Kansas City Royals season.

External links

1942 births
1995 deaths
Charlotte Hornets (baseball) players
Elmira Pioneers players
Evansville Triplets players
Jacksonville Suns players
Kansas City Royals players
Knoxville Sox players
Manchester Yankees players
Major League Baseball second basemen
Major League Baseball shortstops
Major League Baseball players from Puerto Rico
Marion Mets players
Memphis Blues players
Omaha Royals players
Orlando Twins players
People from Mayagüez, Puerto Rico
Raleigh-Durham Mets players
Raleigh-Durham Triangles players
Winter Haven Mets players